Horst Floth (24 July 1934 in Karlsbad – 6 October 2005 in Feldafing) was a West German bobsledder who competed in the late 1960s and early 1970s. Competing in two Winter Olympics, he won silver medals in the two-man event both in 1968 and 1972.

Floth also won a gold medal in the two-man event at the 1970 FIBT World Championships in St. Moritz.

A hotelier when he was not in bobsleigh, Floth died from cancer in 2005.

References
 Bobsleigh two-man Olympic medalists 1932–56 and since 1964
 Bobsleigh two-man world championship medalists since 1931
 BSD announcement of Floth's death – Accessed 12 August 2007 .
 DatabaseOlympics.com profile

1934 births
2005 deaths
People from Karlsruhe (district)
Sportspeople from Karlsruhe (region)
Bobsledders at the 1968 Winter Olympics
Bobsledders at the 1972 Winter Olympics
German male bobsledders
Olympic bobsledders of West Germany
Olympic silver medalists for West Germany
Deaths from cancer in Germany
Olympic medalists in bobsleigh
Medalists at the 1972 Winter Olympics
Medalists at the 1968 Winter Olympics